"Ballerina" is a song by Swedish singer Malou Prytz. The song was performed for the first time in Melodifestivalen 2020, where it made it to the second chance round. The song was written by Jimmy Jansson, Peter Boström and Thomas G:son, while being produced by Boström alone.

Charts

References

2020 singles
English-language Swedish songs
Melodifestivalen songs of 2020
Swedish pop songs
Songs written by Jimmy Jansson
Songs written by Peter Boström
Songs written by Thomas G:son